The Malayan tapir (Tapirus indicus), also called Asian tapir, Asiatic tapir, Oriental tapir, and Indian tapir, is the only tapir species native to Southeast Asia from the Malay Peninsula to Sumatra. It has been listed as Endangered on the IUCN Red List since 2008, as the population is estimated to comprise fewer than 2,500 mature individuals.

Taxonomy
The scientific name Tapirus indicus was proposed by Anselme Gaëtan Desmarest in 1819 who referred to a tapir described by Pierre-Médard Diard.
Tapirus indicus brevetianus was coined by a Dutch zoologist in 1926 who described a black Malayan tapir from Sumatra that had been sent to Rotterdam Zoo in the early 1920s. 

Phylogenetic analyses of 13 Malayan tapirs showed that the species is monophyletic.
It was placed in the genus Acrocodia by Colin Groves and Peter Grubb in 2011. However, a comparison of mitochondrial DNA of 16 perissodactyl species revealed that the Malayan tapir forms a sister group together with the Tapirus species native to the Americas.

Description

The Malayan tapir is easily identified by its markings, most notably the light-colored patch that extends from its shoulders to its hindquarters. It is covered in black hair, except for the tips of its ears, which, as with other tapirs, are rimmed with white. The pattern is for camouflage; the disrupted coloration breaks up its outline and makes it more difficult to recognize; other animals may mistake it for a large rock, rather than prey, when it is lying down to sleep.

The females are usually larger than the males. Like other tapir species, it has a small, stubby tail and a long, flexible proboscis. It has four toes on each front foot and three toes on each back foot. The Malayan tapir has rather poor eyesight, but excellent hearing and sense of smell.

It has a large sagittal crest, a bone running along the middle of the skull that is necessary for muscle attachment. It also possesses unusually positioned orbits, an unusually shaped cranium with the frontal bones elevated, and a retracted nasal incision. These adaptations evolved to support the proboscis. This proboscis caused a retraction of bones and cartilage in the face during the evolution of the tapir, and even caused the loss of some cartilages, facial muscles, and the bony wall of the nasal chamber.

Vision
Malayan tapirs have very poor eyesight, instead relying on excellent senses of smell and hearing. The eyes are small with brown irises, positioned on the sides of the face. Their eyes are often covered in a blue haze, which is corneal cloudiness thought to be caused by repetitive exposure to light. Corneal cloudiness is a condition in which the cornea starts to lose its transparency. The cornea is necessary for the transmitting and focusing of outside light as it enters the eye, and cloudiness can cause vision loss. This causes the Malayan tapir to have very inadequate vision, both on land and in water, where they spend the majority of their time. Also, as these tapirs are most active at night and since they have poor eyesight, it is harder for them to search for food and avoid predators in the dark.

Colour variation 
Two melanistic Malayan tapirs were observed in Jerangau Forest Reserve in Malaysia in 2000. A black Malayan tapir was also recorded in Tekai Tembeling Forest Reserve in Pahang state in 2016.

Distribution and habitat
The Malayan tapir is distributed throughout the tropical lowland rainforests of Southeast Asia, including Sumatra in Indonesia, Peninsular Malaysia, Myanmar, and Thailand. Populations in Sabah in Borneo may have persisted until recently but are now considered extinct.

Behaviour and ecology

Malayan tapirs are primarily solitary, marking out large tracts of land as their territory, though these areas usually overlap with those of other individuals. Tapirs mark out their territories by spraying urine on plants, and they often follow distinct paths, which they have bulldozed through the undergrowth.
Exclusively herbivorous, the animal forages for the tender shoots and leaves of more than 115 species of plants (around 30 are particularly preferred), moving slowly through the forest and pausing often to eat and note the scents left behind by other tapirs in the area. However, when threatened or frightened, the tapir can run quickly, despite its considerable bulk, and can also defend itself with its strong jaws and sharp teeth. Malayan tapirs communicate with high-pitched squeaks and whistles. They usually prefer to live near water and often bathe and swim, and they are also able to climb steep slopes. Tapirs are mainly active at night, though they are not exclusively nocturnal. They tend to eat soon after sunset or before sunrise, and they will often nap in the middle of the night. This behaviour characterizes them as crepuscular animals.

Lifecycle

Malayan tapirs are the largest of the four tapir species at birth and in general grow more quickly than their relatives. Young tapirs of all species have brown hair with white stripes and spots, a pattern that enables them to hide effectively in the dappled light of the forest. This baby coat fades into adult coloration between four and seven months after birth. Weaning occurs between six and eight months of age, at which time the babies are nearly full-grown, and the animals reach sexual maturity around age three. Breeding typically occurs in April, May or June, and females generally produce one calf every two years. Malayan tapirs can live up to 30 years, both in the wild and in captivity.

Predators 
Because of its size, the Malayan tapir has few natural predators, and even reports of killings by tigers (Panthera tigris), leopards (Panthera pardus), or dholes (Cuon alpinus) are scarce.

Threats 
The main threat to the Malayan tapir is loss and destruction of habitat through deforestation. Large tracts of forests in Thailand and Malaysia have been converted for planting oil palms. Habitat fragmentation in peninsular Malaysia caused displacement of 142 Malayan tapirs between 2006 and 2010; some were rescued and relocated, 15 of them were roadkills.

References

External links

ARKive – images and movies of the Asian tapir (Tapirus indicus)
Tapir Specialist Group – Malayan Tapir

Tapirs
tapir
Mammals of Malaysia
Mammals of Indonesia
Mammals of Myanmar
Mammals of Thailand
Endangered fauna of Asia
EDGE species
Mammals described in 1819
Taxobox binomials not recognized by IUCN